Elisabeth Helmer (1854 – after 1912) was an early Norwegian professional female photographer who had a studio in Grimstad. She was also one of the town's most important women's rights activists.

Biography

Born on 24 October 1854 in Grimstad, Helmer was the daughter of the surveyor Jacob Holst Helmer. She was trained by the German-born Norwegian photographer Louise Abel who ran a studio in Christiania together with her husband Hans Abel. In 1896, she opened her own studio in Grimstad which she managed until 1912 when she ceded the business to Gunhild Larsen whom she had trained and introduced as her business partner in 1902. She also trained many other photographers. In addition to portraits, Helmer also took landscape photographs of Grimstad and the surroundings, several of which have been preserved in the National Library of Norway.

Helmer was also an active feminist, heading the Grimstad branch of Landskvindestemmeretsforeningen, the Norwegian women's rights association, and its successor Kvindernes Klub, the Women's Club.

There is no record of the date of Elisabeth Helmer's death.

References

External links
Examples of Elisabeth Helmer's work from the National Library of Norway

1854 births
People from Grimstad
19th-century Norwegian photographers
Norwegian women photographers
Norwegian women's rights activists
Year of death missing
19th-century women photographers